An interrupted screw or interrupted thread is a mechanical device typically used in the breech of artillery guns. It is believed to have been invented in 1845.

The system has also been used to close other applications, including the joint between helmet (bonnet) and breastplate (corselet) of standard diving suit helmets, and the locks of diving chambers.

Design
An interrupted screw has a section of thread along its axis removed. The screw is mated with a partially threaded hole in the receptacle: threadless channels in the breechblock screw line up with the threaded parts of the screw, and vice versa.  The screw can thus be smoothly inserted all the way into the receptacle, after which as little as one-eighth of a turn can engage the two sets of threads securely, sealing the joint.

The amount of rotation required to achieve full closure depends on the number of unthreaded sectors. The minimum balanced arrangement has two sectors of 90°, and requires 1/4 turn to lock. three sectors of 60° requires 1/6 turn to lock, and the typical arrangement on a diving helmet, four sectors of 45°, requires 1/8 turn to lock.

Applications

In the artillery application, the screw is set into the breechblock and mated with a partially threaded hole at the rear of the weapon's chamber.

American engraver Benjamin Chambers, Sr. received  in 1849 for a wrought iron built-up gun "dissected screw breech" with "sectional screws" "cut therein for the purpose of speedily opening the breech for swabbing, depositing the load, and readily closing it again when the gun is to be discharged". His gun was built and tested with metallic cartridges, center-primed with a percussion cap, because US Navy was initially interested, and chief of the Bureau of Ordnance Charles Morris recommended more developments, but the system was too expensive for the time and cheaper Dahlgren guns were adopted instead.

Breech sealing was improved with the de Bange obturator in 1872, and all interrupted screw breeches with this system were generally known as the De Bange type.

Weakness
The major weakness of the original designs was that only half of the circumference of the breechblock could be threaded, hence a fairly long breechblock was still required to achieve a secure lock. Axel Welin solved this problem with his stepped interrupted screw design: the Welin breech block of 1890. This design has threads of the block and breech cut in steps of successively larger radius. For example, this allows a breechblock with four steps to allow four-fifths of the block circumference to be threaded, allowing for a much shorter breechblock while still requiring only one-fifth of a turn to open or close. This is the basic design still in use with bagged charge artillery.  

Interrupted screws are occasionally seen in loose gunpowder rifles, as this mechanism was historically one of the few practical ways to achieve a gas-proof seal with a breech-loading firearm that does not employ metallic cartridges. An earlier method was the use of a wedge to block the rear of the gun.

The system has also been used to close other applications, including the joint between helmet (bonnet) and breastplate (corselet) of standard diving suit helmets, and the locks of diving chambers.

References

External links
Interrupted Screw Breech Mechanisms
Precision Screwdriver Set Manufacturing
Interrupted Threads Used On Naval Guns

Screws
Firearm components